Hepburn Library is a historic library building located at Norfolk in St. Lawrence County, New York. It was designed by architects Rossiter & Muller and built in 1919–1920.  It is a "T" shaped, cross gable roofed  Georgian Revival style brick building on a full, raised basement.  Funding for its construction was provided by local philanthropist A. Barton Hepburn.

It was listed on the National Register of Historic Places in 2004.

References

Libraries on the National Register of Historic Places in New York (state)
Library buildings completed in 1920
Buildings and structures in St. Lawrence County, New York
National Register of Historic Places in St. Lawrence County, New York
1920 establishments in New York (state)